The 2013 Israeli Beach Soccer League was a national beach soccer league that took place between 31 May and 26 July 2013, in Netanya, Israel.

Group stage
All kickoff times are of local time in Netanya, Israel (UTC+02:00).

Group A

Group B

Knockout stage

Quarter-finals

Semi-finals

Relegation playoffs

Exhibition match

Final

Winners

Awards

See also
 Israeli Beach Soccer League

External links
 Kfar Qassem on Beach Soccer Worldwide

Youtube highlights

 Rosh HaAyin vs. Petah Tikva from Round 1
 Rosh HaAyin vs. Tel Aviv from Round 2
 Rosh HaAyin vs. Jerusalem from Round 3
 Rosh HaAyin vs. Kfar Saba from Round 4
 Rosh HaAyin vs. Jaffa from Quarter Final
 Rosh HaAyin vs. Netanya from Semi Final
 Kfar Qassem vs. Netanya The Final

References

Israeli Beach Soccer League seasons
National beach soccer leagues
2013 in beach soccer